Live @ An Club is the second live album by the UK band, Antimatter, released in 2009.

Track listing
All songs written by Mick Moss except where stated

Credits
Acoustic guitar/vocals: Mick Moss (1,2,3,4,5,6,7,8,9)
Acoustic guitar: Danny Cavanagh (1,2,3,7,8,9)
Additional vocals: Pete Gilchrist (1,2,3,4,5,6,7,8)
Producer: Mick Moss
Engineer: Chris Ntaskas
Masterer: Les Smith
Cover art: Mick Moss

External links 
 Official site

References

2003 live albums
Antimatter (band) albums